Agneta Karlsson (born 1962) is a Swedish Social Democratic Party politician.

She was elected deputy member of the Riksdag for the period 2014–2018 from the Stockholm County constituency. She has also served as State Secretary, including for Ingela Thalén and for Gabriel Wikström.

References

1962 births
Living people
Members of the Riksdag from the Social Democrats
Women members of the Riksdag
Members of the Riksdag 2014–2018
21st-century Swedish women politicians